The Ohio Open is the Ohio state open golf tournament, open to both amateur and professional golfers. It is organized by the Northern Ohio section of the PGA of America. It was first played in 1924 and has been played annually (with minor disruptions) at a variety of courses around the state. It was considered a PGA Tour event in the late 1920s and early 1930s.

Winners

2022 Jordan Gilkison (amateur) 
2021 Jake McBride
2020 Alex Weiss
2019 Stephen Gangluff
2018 Stephen Gangluff
2017 Chase Wilson
2016 Tim Crouch
2015 Justin Lower
2014 Tim Ailes
2013 Colin Biles
2012 Justin Lower
2011 Mike Emery
2010 Bob Sowards
2009 Vaughn Snyder
2008 Tyler Riley
2007 Eric Frishette
2006 Danny Sahl
2005 Rob Moss
2004 Bob Sowards
2003 Ryan Dennis
2002 Bob Sowards
2001 Rob Moss
2000 Ken Tanigawa
1999 Rob Moss
1998 Chris Black
1997 Nevin Sutcliffe
1996 Dennis Miller
1995 Ivan Smith
1994 Chris Smith
1993 Mitch Camp
1992 Chris Smith
1991 Jack Ferenz
1990 Bruce Soulsby
1989 Tony Mollica
1988 Don Padgett II
1987 Joe Kruczek
1986 Gary Robison
1985 Mitch Camp
1984 Roy Hobson
1983 Gene Boni
1982 Walter Cerrato
1981 Kim Boehlke
1980 Jim Logue
1979 Gary Trivisonno
1978 Bob Lewis (amateur)
1977 Gene Ferrell
1976 Martin Roesink
1975 Todd Crandall
1974 Deon Good
1973 Dick Plummer
1972 Bob Wynn
1971 Bob Wynn
1970 Bob Wynn
1969 Cliff Cook
1968 Frank Wharton
1967 Frank Boynton
1966 Frank Boynton
1965 Tom Weiskopf
1964 Don Stickney
1963 Bob Shave
1962 Bob Shave
1961 Frank Stranahan
1960 Frank Stranahan
1959 Lee Raymond
1958 Bob Shave (amateur)
1957 Ed Griffiths
1956 Jack Nicklaus (amateur)
1955 Billy Burke
1954 Dick Shoemaker
1953 Dick Shoemaker
1952 Frank Gelhot
1951 Herman Keiser
1950 Denny Shute
1949 Herman Keiser
1948 Frank Stranahan (amateur)
1947 Al Marchi
1946 John Krisko
1945 Billy Burke
1944 Maurice McCarthy (amateur)
1943 No tournament
1942 Byron Nelson
1941 Byron Nelson
1940 Byron Nelson
1939 Billy Burke
1938 Billy Burke
1937 Philip Perkins
1936 Al Espinosa
1935 Ted Luther
1934 Lloyd Gullickson
1933 Al Espinosa
1932 Al Espinosa
1931 Denny Shute
1930 Denny Shute
1929 Denny Shute
1928 Jack Thompson
1927 Albert Alcroft
1926 Albert Alcroft
1925 Larry Nabholtz
1924 Emmet French

Sources:

Notes and references

External links
PGA of America – Northern Ohio section
List of winners

Former PGA Tour events
Golf in Ohio
PGA of America sectional tournaments
State Open golf tournaments